Pawnee is a census-designated place (CDP) in Bee County, Texas, United States. The population was 166 at the 2010 census.

Geography
Pawnee is located in northwestern Bee County at  (28.649307, -98.001649). Texas State Highway 72 runs through the community, leading northeast  to Kenedy and southwest  to Interstate 37 near Three Rivers.

Attractions
Pawnee is known for its excellent dove, quail, and white tail deer hunting.

Demographics
As of the census of 2000, there were 201 people, 75 households, and 54 families residing in the CDP. The population density was 38.5 people per square mile (14.9/km2). There were 93 housing units at an average density of 17.8/sq mi (6.9/km2). The racial makeup of the CDP was 58.21% White, 0.50% African American, 41.29% from other races. Hispanic or Latino of any race were 90.05% of the population.

There were 75 households, out of which 29.3% had children under the age of 18 living with them, 66.7% were married couples living together, 1.3% had a female householder with no husband present, and 28.0% were non-families. 24.0% of all households were made up of individuals, and 16.0% had someone living alone who was 65 years of age or older. The average household size was 2.68 and the average family size was 3.28.

In the CDP, the population was spread out, with 23.9% under the age of 18, 8.5% from 18 to 24, 26.9% from 25 to 44, 21.9% from 45 to 64, and 18.9% who were 65 years of age or older. The median age was 38 years. For every 100 females, there were 109.4 males. For every 100 females age 18 and over, there were 109.6 males.

The median income for a household in the CDP was $35,500, and the median income for a family was $57,000. Males had a median income of $46,042 versus $37,125 for females. The per capita income for the CDP was $21,165. About 17.0% of families and 19.9% of the population were below the poverty line, including 26.7% of those under the age of eighteen and 35.8% of those 65 or over.

Education
Pawnee is served by the Pawnee Independent School District for grades preK-8.

Area information
The small town consists of one convenience store, a US post office, an Independent School District, a mechanic service, a natural gas plant, a cabinet maker, a volunteer fire department, an excavation company, a community center, and several churches.

The Pawnee area has gradually been increasing in the exploration and production of natural gas. Just driving around the community and ranches, you can see wells and new rigs going up.

Pawnee has more recently welcomed Almega Cable and Ranch Wireless to the community. Ranch Wireless provides wireless internet and Almega Cable provides Cable internet to the citizens of Pawnee. Almega has also established a computer center for the community to access the internet free of cost. The center is called the Pawnee Community Connect Center.

Religion
The small community boasts five churches. The churches are Catholic, Methodist, Baptist, Igelesia Bautista Y Manuela, and Church of Christ.

References

External links
 Handbook of Texas Online article

Census-designated places in Bee County, Texas
Census-designated places in Texas